Raymond T. Carhart was a Speech/Language Pathologist. As a founder and pioneer of the science, he is frequently referred to as the "Father of Audiology."
Carhart was born on March 28, 1912, in Mexico City. He studied at Dakota Wesleyan University (BA in Speech and Psychology, 1932), and at Northwestern University (MA, 1934, and PhD, 1936, in Speech Pathology, Experimental Phonetics and Psychology).
He remained at Northwestern until 1944, first as instructor in Speech Re-education and later as Assistant (1940) and Associate (1943) Professor. He joined the US Army Medical Administrative Corps in 1944, working in Butler, Pennsylvania until 1946. He returned to Northwestern in 1947, where he remained until his death in 1975.

"Carhart notch effect" is a decrease in the bone-conduction hearing at the 2000 Hz region of patients with otosclerosis first reported by and therefore named after Raymond Carhart.

References

Notes
 Hall, James W.; H. Gustav Mueller (1998). Audiologists Desk Reference: Audiologic Management, Rehabilitation and Terminology. Thomson Delmar Learning. ., p. 912
 Hall, James W. (1999). Handbook of Otoacoustic Emissions. Thomson Delmar Learning. ., p. 2: the Father of Audiology himself, Raymond Carhart at Northwestern University..."

Audiologists
Dakota Wesleyan University alumni
Northwestern University alumni
Northwestern University faculty
1912 births
1975 deaths
United States Army Medical Corps officers